The Biljanini Izvori Sports Hall (transliterated Sportska sala Biljanini Izvori) is a multi-functional indoor sports arena. It is located in Ohrid, North Macedonia. The sports hall was inaugurated in August 1998 and has a capacity of 4,000 seats for handball and 4,500 for basketball. It is used by several handball and basketball teams from Ohrid. It was one of two venues used during the 2008 European Women's Handball Championship.

Notable events 
 Macedonian handball trophy (women), August 1998
 European Youth Championships in basketball, July–August 2000
 Qualification matches of men's and women's basketball national team
 European Junior Championships in handball
 Balkan Police Championships
 Balkan Youth Olympic Days 2002
 Professional boxing matches
 Men's Junior Handball Championship - 2007
 2008 European Women's Handball Championship

References

External links
 

Handball venues in North Macedonia
Indoor arenas in North Macedonia
Basketball venues in North Macedonia
Sport in Ohrid